In the Tam Duong bus crash, 15 May 2005, 19 people were killed after a bus fell 150m down ravine after colliding with a motorcycle.

The fate of the motorcycle rider is unclear.

Tam Đường district in Lai Châu province is 500 km northwest of Hanoi.

Vietnam has an appalling road safety record mainly due to widespread disregard for traffic regulations.

See also
 List of road accidents 2000–09

References 

2005 disasters in Vietnam
Bus incidents in Vietnam
2005 in Vietnam
2005 road incidents
Lai Châu province
May 2005 events in Asia